Daniele Nardello (born 2 August 1972 in Varese) is a retired Italian professional road racing cyclist. His career ran from 1994 to 2009, with highlights including winning the 2001 Italian national road race championship, the 2003 Züri-Metzgete, and three straight top-10 finishes and one stage win at the Tour de France.

Career achievements

Major results

1990
 1st  Road race, National Junior Road Championships
 4th Road race, UCI Road World Championships
1994
 2nd Overall Herald Sun Tour
1995
 1st Paris–Bourges
 2nd Giro di Lombardia
 5th Overall Tour DuPont
 7th GP Rik Van Steenbergen
1996
 1st Milano–Torino
 1st Grand Prix d'Europe (with Fabio Roscioli)
 1st Stage 12 Vuelta a España
 4th Time trial, UCI Road World Championships
 4th Giro di Lombardia
 5th Overall Circuit de la Sarthe
1st Stage 1
 5th Trofeo Melinda
 6th Japan Cup
 7th Tre Valli Varesine
 9th Giro del Piemonte
1997
 1st  Overall Tour of Austria
1st Stages 1 & 7
 2nd Trofeo Matteotti
 2nd Giro dell'Appennino
 7th Overall Tour de Suisse
 7th Tour de Berne
 8th Wincanton Classic
 8th Tre Valli Varesine
1998
 2nd Road race, National Road Championships
 2nd Overall Grand Prix Guillaume Tell
1st Stage 3
 2nd Japan Cup
 2nd Giro del Piemonte
 3rd Coppa Bernocchi
 4th Giro del Lazio
 5th Clásica de San Sebastián
 6th Paris–Brussels
 7th GP Industria & Commercio di Prato
 7th Tre Valli Varesine
 8th Overall Tour de France
1st Stage 13
 9th Overall Tour of Austria
 9th Paris–Bourges
1999
 1st Paris–Bourges
 1st Stage 11 Vuelta a España
 3rd Time trial, National Road Championships
 3rd Brabantse Pijl
 7th Overall Tour de France
 9th Amstel Gold Race
 10th Road race, UCI Road World Championships
2000
 1st  Overall Circuit Franco-Belge
 1st Tour du Haut Var
 1st Trofeo Laigueglia
 1st Duo Normand (with László Bodrogi)
 3rd Road race, National Road Championships
 3rd Paris–Tours
 4th Josef Voegeli Memorial
 4th Grand Prix d'Europe
 6th Grand Prix Eddy Merckx
 7th Overall Tour de Suisse
 9th Overall Tour of Austria
1st Stage 5
 10th Overall Tour de France
 10th Overall Tour Méditerranéen
 10th Omloop Het Volk
2001
 1st  Road race, National Road Championships
 1st Tour du Haut Var
 1st Stage 7 Tour of Austria
 2nd Giro di Romagna
 2nd Trofeo Laigueglia
 3rd Danmark Rundt
 4th Overall Tour Down Under
 4th Trofeo Melinda
 5th Tour of Flanders
 5th Coppa Placci
 6th Omloop Het Volk
 8th Gent–Wevelgem
 9th Classic Haribo
 10th Brabantse Pijl
2002
 1st Coppa Bernocchi
 2nd Gran Premio Bruno Beghelli
 3rd Overall Tour de la Region Wallonne
 4th Trofeo Melinda
 4th Giro di Romagna
 4th Tour du Haut Var
 5th Overall Tour Down Under
 5th Tour of Flanders
2003 
 1st  Overall Rheinland-Pfalz Rundfahrt
1st Stage 2
 1st Züri-Metzgete
 1st Stage 5 Hessen Rundfahrt
 8th Paris–Roubaix
2004
 2nd GP Fred Mengoni
 4th GP Industria & Commercio di Prato
 5th Giro di Lombardia
2005
 5th Overall Danmark Rundt
 9th LuK Challenge
2007
 2nd GP de Fourmies
 3rd Giro del Veneto
 6th GP Nobili Rubinetterie

Grand Tour general classification results timeline

References

External links

1972 births
Living people
Italian male cyclists
Olympic cyclists of Italy
Cyclists at the 2004 Summer Olympics
Italian Tour de France stage winners
Italian Vuelta a España stage winners
Cyclists from Varese